Jimbour may refer to:
 Australia
 Jimbour, Queensland, a town in Queensland
 Jimbour East, Queensland, a locality in Queensland
 Jimbour West, Queensland, a locality in Queensland 
 Jimbour Station, a pastoral run in Queensland
 Jimbour Homestead, a heritage-listed homestead of the pastoral run (also called Jimbour House)
 Jimbour Dry Stone Wall, a heritage-listed stone wall built on the pastoral run